Stuart Colin Catterall (born 9 April 1975) is a former English cricketer.  Catterall was a right-handed batsman who bowled right-arm off break.  He was born at Southampton, Hampshire.

Catterall represented the Lancashire Cricket Board in List A cricket.  His debut List A match came against the Essex Cricket Board in the 2000 NatWest Trophy.  From 2000 to 2002, he represented the Board in 4 List A matches, the last of which came against Scotland in the 2nd round of the 2003 Cheltenham & Gloucester Trophy which was played in 2002.  In his 4 List A matches, he scored 64 runs at a batting average of 32.00, with a high score of 37*.  With the ball he took a single wicket at a bowling average of 73.00, with best figures of 1/34.

References

External links
Stuart Catterall at Cricinfo
Stuart Catterall at CricketArchive

1975 births
Living people
Cricketers from Southampton
English cricketers
Lancashire Cricket Board cricketers